Poi Mugangal is a 1986 Indian Tamil-language film directed by C. V. Rajendran. The film stars Rakesh and Sulakshana. Rakesh previously produced the Tamil film Padikkadavan (1985), under his real name V. Ravichandran. The film is based on the story Kakitha Changiligal by Sujatha. It was released on 28 March 1986.

Plot 

The story is about a young husband who has a kidney disorder and pleads with his wife's blood relatives to wait for an alternative kidney.

Cast 
 Rakesh as Raja
 Sulakshana as Indu
 Y. G. Mahendran
 Sivachandran
 Arundhati
 V. S. Raghavan
 V. Gopalakrishnan

Production 
Kannada actor V. Ravichandran was credited as Rakesh. The film is based on the novel Kakitha Changiligal by Sujatha.

Soundtrack 
The songs were composed by the music duo Shankar–Ganesh, with lyrics by Vairamuthu.

Reception 
Kalki noted that, despite deviating from the source material, it was still a good film.

References

External links 
 

1980s Tamil-language films
1986 films
Films based on Indian novels
Films directed by C. V. Rajendran
Films scored by Shankar–Ganesh